Labiovelar consonant may refer to: